The 1948 United States presidential election in Minnesota took place on November 2, 1948 as part of the 1948 United States presidential election. Voters chose 11 electors, or representatives to the Electoral College, who voted for president and vice president.

Minnesota was won by the Democratic candidate, incumbent President Harry S. Truman, who had assumed the presidency following the death of Franklin D. Roosevelt in 1945, won the state over New York governor Thomas E. Dewey by a margin of 209,349 votes, or 17.27%. Nationally, the election was the greatest election upset in American history; nearly every prediction forecast that Truman would be defeated by Dewey, but in the end, Truman won the election with 303 electoral votes and a comfortable 4.5% lead over Dewey in the popular vote.

The election was the first presidential election since 1928 which did not feature Roosevelt as the Democratic nominee. It was also the last of six presidential elections in which Norman Thomas was the nominee of the Socialist Party of America, and the last presidential election in which the Socialist Party (which was once very popular in the state) attained ballot access in Minnesota, prior to its 1973 split.

Results

Results by county

See also
 United States presidential elections in Minnesota

References

1948
Min
1948 Minnesota elections